Wriothesley Russell, 3rd Duke of Bedford (25 May 1708 – 23 October 1732) was an English nobleman and peer. He was the son of Wriothesley Russell, 2nd Duke of Bedford.

Russell married his sister's stepdaughter, Lady Anne Egerton, daughter of Scroop Egerton, 1st Duke of Bridgwater, on 22 April 1725.

He died in 1732, aged 24 at Corunna, Spain, without issue. He was buried on 14 December 1732 in the 'Bedford Chapel' at St. Michael’s Church, Chenies, Buckinghamshire, and his titles passed to his brother, John Russell, 4th Duke of Bedford.

1708 births
1732 deaths
403
Wriothesley
Wriothesley